Acacia multistipulosa is a shrub or tree belonging to the genus Acacia and the subgenus Juliflorae that is native to northern Australia.

Description
It has dark brown to black to grey coloured bark that is smooth on younger trees but becomes longitudinally fissured as it ages. The plant has terete and densely haired branchlets with very conspicuous stipules. Like most species of Acacia it has phyllodes rather than true leaves. The evergreen phyllodes have a narrowly elliptic to oblanceolate shape and can be slightly sickle-shaped. It blooms between March and June producing golden flowers.

Distribution
It is endemic to the Northern Territory where it is confined to an area within Kakadu National Park where it is often situated on rocky ledges, usually amongst boulders growing in sandy soils over sandstone as a part of open Eucalyptus woodland communities with an understorey of Triodia.

See also
List of Acacia species

References

multistipulosa
Flora of the Northern Territory
Plants described in 1996